Nyakyusa may refer to:
 Nyakyusa people
 Nyakyusa language

Language and nationality disambiguation pages